Diane Carmela Torres Querrer (born January 2, 1989) is a Filipina junior journalist and former beauty pageant titleholder.

Filmography

See also

Athena Imperial
Cathy Untalan
Emma Tiglao
Ganiel Krishnan
Tina Marasigan

References

External links
 

Living people
1989 births
Filipino television news anchors
Miss Philippines Earth winners
People from Tanauan, Batangas
People's Television Network
Women television journalists